Vladimir Lučić (born 28 June 2002) is a Serbian football left winger who plays for Čukarički on loan from Red Star Belgrade.

International career
Lučić debut for Serbia U21 national team was on 6 June 2021 in a friendly match against Russia U21.

Lučić made his debut for Serbia national football team on 25 January 2023 in a friendly match against USA. Serbia won the game 2 – 1, with Lučić being a starter.

Career statistics

International

References

External links
 

 

2002 births
Living people
Association football forwards
Serbian footballers
Serbian First League players
Red Star Belgrade footballers
RFK Grafičar Beograd players
FK IMT players
People from Belgrade
Serbia international footballers